Marko Tomasović may refer to:

 Marko Tomasović (boxer) (born 1981), Croatian boxer and kickboxer
 Marko Tomasović (composer) (born 1976), Croatian composer and songwriter